MMMC may refer to:

 3100 (disambiguation) in Roman numerals
 Myanmar Mercatile Marine College, a former name of Yangon Institute of Marine Technology
 Metal, Mining, Maritime and Construction Union, an affiliate of the Namibia National Labour Organisation
 Multani Mal Modi College
 MultiMedia Magazine Creator, see Miggybyte